Crawford Hall may refer to:

 Crawford Hall (Irvine), an athletics building at the University of California, Irvine
 Crawford Hall, a building at the University of Pittsburgh
 Crawford Hall, a residence dormitory in Ohio State University housing
 Crawford Hall, University of Mysore vice chancellor’s office